Eimeria nieschulzi is an apicomplexan parasite of the genus Eimeria that infects the brown rat (Rattus norvegicus).

References

Conoidasida
Parasites of rodents